

Paleozoology

Arthropods

Insects

Vertebrates

Conodonts

Jawless fish 
Edward Branson and Maurice Mehl described the extinct genus of heterostracan agnathan Cardipeltis in the Jefferson Formation of Utah.

Newly named archosauromorphs

Dinosaurs 
Data courtesy of George Olshevsky's dinosaur genera list.

Synapsids

Non-mammalian

References

1930s in paleontology
Paleontology 1